Dave O'Higgins (born 1 September 1964) is an English jazz saxophonist, composer, arranger, educator and latterly recording engineer and producer.

Born in Birmingham, O'Higgins first emerged on the British jazz scene in the 1980s. After playing in the National Youth Jazz Orchestra for three years O'Higgins joined the band of Jim Mullen before moving on to Martin Taylor's band.

His influences are drawn from Charlie Parker, Dexter Gordon, John Coltrane, Joe Henderson through to Stanley Turrentine and Michael Brecker. His current project is The Dave O'Higgins Quartet with Sebastiaan de Krom (drums), Geoff Gascoyne (bass) and Graham Harvey (piano). He also plays, tours and writes with Matt Bianco.

Discography

As leader
 1993 All Good Things (EFZ)
 1994 Beats Working For A Living (recorded in New York) (EFZ)
 1995 Under The Stone (EFZ) (jazz quintet plus string section)
 1996 The Secret Ingredient (EFZ)
 1999 The Grinder’s Monkey (Short Fuse)
 2001 Big Shake Up by Dave O’Higgins’ Biggish Band (Candid)
 2002 Fast Foot Shuffle (Candid)
 2004 Push (Short Fuse)
 2008 In the Zone (Jazzizit)
 2009 Sketchbook
 2010 Relaxin' at Mount Lavinia (JVG)
 2011 The Devil's Interval (with Eric Alexander) (JVG)
 2012 Got the Real Note (Jazzizit) with the Gascoyne/O'Higgins Quartet
 2013 Two Minds Big Band (JVG)
 2014 Standards (JVG)
 2014 The Real Note Vol. 2 (Jazzizit) with the Gascoyne/O'Higgins Quartet
 2015 Oh, Gee (Woodville)
 2015 The Abstract Truth Big Band (JVG Productions)
 2017  It's Always 9.30 In Zog  (JVG Productions)

As sideman
With Martin Taylor
 1994 Spirit of Django
 1996 Years Apart
 2000 Gypsy

With Others
 1986 No Limits, Mezzoforte
 1989 For Mad Men only, Roadside Picnic
 1997 Sweet Surprise, Trudy Kerr
 2001 An Ordinary Day in an Unusual Place, Us3
 2003 Goodbye Swingtime, Matthew Herbert
 2005 Ruby Blue, Róisín Murphy
 2006 Now, Kyle Eastwood
 2007 Rise Up, Nasio Fontaine
 2008 There's Me and There's You, Matthew Herbert
 2012 Upside Down, Jazzanova

References

External links
Official site

Living people
1964 births
English jazz saxophonists
People from Birmingham, West Midlands
Academics of Leeds College of Music
Musicians from Birmingham, West Midlands
British male saxophonists
21st-century saxophonists
21st-century British male musicians
British male jazz musicians
National Youth Jazz Orchestra members
Curfew (band) members